Alveim is a village in Øygarden municipality in northwestern Vestland county, Norway. It is located on the western side of the island of Alvøyna.

References

Villages in Vestland
Øygarden